El Kaakour or Qaaqour is a small village in the Matn District of Lebanon. It's about 930 meters above sea level. It's located in a very mountainous area surrounded by pine trees. All people born in Kaakour are Maronite of the following families: Mazloum, Ashkar, Jerdak, Abou Antoun

Population: around 2000.

See also
Catholic Church in Lebanon

References

Populated places in the Matn District
Maronite Christian communities in Lebanon